The Ban Soc bent-toed gecko (Cyrtodactylus bansocensis) is a species of gecko endemic to central Laos.

References

Cyrtodactylus
Reptiles described in 2016